Lord Arthur Lennox (2 October 1806 – 15 January 1864) was a British politician. He was the youngest son of the 4th Duke of Richmond and the uncle of Lord Henry Lennox.

Lennox was commissioned into the 71st Foot. He was promoted lieutenant in 1825, major in 1838 and lieutenant-colonel in 1842. He transferred to the 72nd Foot in 1843, to the 6th Foot in 1845, and to the 68th Foot in 1852. He was made lieutenant-colonel-commandant of the Royal Sussex Light Infantry Militia in 1860.

On 1 July 1835 he married Adelaide Constance Campbell, daughter of Colonel John Campbell of Shawfield and the writer Lady Charlotte Bury. They had four children:
 Constance Charlotte Elisa Lennox (March 1836 – 20 June 1925), married Sir George Russell, 4th Baronet and had issue
 Ada Fanny Susan Lennox (1840 – 22 November 1881)
 Ethel Lennox
 Arthur Charles Wriothesley Lennox (1842 – 12 October 1876)

Lennox was buried in Brompton Cemetery, London.

References

External links 
 

The Peerage – Person page 7927

 

1806 births
1864 deaths
68th Regiment of Foot officers
British Militia officers
Burials at Brompton Cemetery
Members of the Parliament of the United Kingdom for English constituencies
Royal Warwickshire Fusiliers officers
72nd Highlanders officers
UK MPs 1831–1832
UK MPs 1832–1835
UK MPs 1835–1837
UK MPs 1837–1841
UK MPs 1841–1847
Younger sons of dukes
71st Highlanders officers
Politics of the Borough of Great Yarmouth